Friends & Family, Vol. 1 is an album containing various artists' material including Suicidal Tendencies and Infectious Grooves. It was released by Suicidal Records in 1997.

It was sub-titled "Epic Escape" because Suicidal Tendencies – whose singer Mike Muir runs Suicidal Records – had exited the Epic Records label on which they had released much of their late 1980s and early 1990s material.

The Suicidal Tendencies tracks, "Scream Out" and "We Are Family", were eventually re-recorded and ended up on their next album, Freedumb in 1999.

The Cyco Miko track, "Big Fat Baby", was a re-recording of a track called "Lost My Brain (Once Again)" on the 1995 album of the same name.

Track listing

Credits

Suicidal Tendencies and Infectious Grooves
 Mike Muir – vocals
 Mike Clark – guitar
 Dean Pleasants – guitar
 Josh Paul – bass
 Brooks Wackerman – drums

Cyco Miko 
 Mike Muir – vocals
 Adam Siegel – guitar
 Dave Kushner – guitar
 Dave Silva – bass
 Greg Saenz – drums

The Funeral Party 
 Claudia Ashton – vocals
 Fiendly – guitar and keyboards
 Dosage – guitar
 Splinters – bass
 Sam Pokeybo – drums

Creeper 
 Mike "Milkbone" Jensen – vocals
 Mike Clark – guitar
 Michael Alvarado – drums
 @&*% – bass

Musical Heroin
 The Freakazoid Twins
 Freaky Deaky – all instruments
 Deaky Freaky – all instruments

All tracks 
 Recorded at Titan Studios
 Tracks 1 – 6 produced by Suicidal Tendencies
 Tracks 9, 10, 13, and 14 produced by The Freakazoid Twins
 All songs engineered and additional production by Michael Vail Blum
 Executive produced by Albert Rouillard
 Tracks 1 – 5 mixed by Paul Northfield
 All other songs are rough mixes
 Mastered by Brian Gardner at Bernie Grundman Mastering

External links
Suicidal Tendencies official website

Suicidal Tendencies albums
Suicidal Records albums
1997 compilation albums